Firozwala, is a city of Sheikhupura District in the Punjab province of Pakistan. The city is headquarters of Firozwala Tehsil and is located near the provincial capital Lahore. Situated on the Grand Trunk Road, it is the 64th largest city of Pakistan.

See also 
 Sheikhupura
 Muridke
 Sharaqpur Sharif

References

Populated places in Sheikhupura District